Webley may refer to:
 Webley & Scott or Webley, a British arms manufacturer
 Webley Revolver
 Webley Stinger, an air pistol
 .442 Webley revolver cartridge
 .455 Webley handgun cartridge
 .45 Webley, an 11 mm caliber revolver cartridge
 Webley (company), a company providing speech-driven unified communications solutions

People 
 Donald Martin Webley (1916–1990), British microbiologist
 Emily Webley-Smith (born 1984), English professional tennis player
 Big George (1957–2011), or George Webley, British musician, composer, bandleader, and broadcaster
 Jason Webley (born 1974), American musician
 Paul Webley (1953–2016), British scholar of economic psychology
 Peter Webley (born 1942), English cricketer
 Tom Webley (born 1983), English cricketer
 Webley Edwards (1902–1977), World War II news correspondent and Hawaiian radio personality
 Webley John Hauxhurst (1809–1874), pioneer in Oregon Country

Fictional
 Webley Webster, a character created by Ray Goulding of the Bob and Ray comedy team

See also
 Mars Automatic Pistol, or Webley-Mars
 Webley–Fosbery Automatic Revolver
 Webbley, a historic home in North Carolina, US
 Weebly, a web-hosting service